Karl Axel Johansson (16 October 1885 – 2 February 1979) was a Swedish rower who competed in the 1912 Summer Olympics. He was a member of the Swedish boat Göteborgs RF that was eliminated in the quarter finals of the coxed fours, inriggers tournament.

References

External links

1885 births
1979 deaths
Olympic rowers of Sweden
Rowers at the 1912 Summer Olympics
Swedish male rowers
Sportspeople from Gothenburg